The 1983 USFL Territorial Draft was the first Territorial Draft of the United States Football League (USFL). It took place on January 4, 1983, at the Grand Hyatt Hotel in New York.

Player selections

References

External links
 1983 USFL Territorial Draft Pick Transactions
 1983 USFL Draft

United States Football League drafts
USFL Territorial Draft
USFL Territorial Draft
1980s in Manhattan
American football in New York City
Sports in Manhattan
Sporting events in New York City
USFL Territorial Draft